Dockapps, or docked applications are computer programs which appear to reside inside an icon rather than a window in graphical computer systems, normally in a part of the user interface known as the dock.  Their display is constantly updated just like a windowed application, but appears inside a small (64x64 pixel) icon.

This makes dockapps particularly suitable for monitoring things in the background, and some applications of dockapps are:
Displaying CPU usage
Displaying computer temperatures
Displaying network or disk-usage statistics
Displaying clocks, calendars, moon phases, or weather reports

See also 
Dock (computing)

External links
 dockapps.net - a central repository for many dockapps
 xdock - an application that emulates Window Maker docks in any window manager

Desktop environments